Smith Act trial may refer to:
Smith Act legal proceedings
Smith Act trials of Communist Party leaders

See also
Irrigation District Act of 1916 (Smith Act)
Debbie Smith Act
Smith–Lever Act of 1914